The 2017 Mayadin offensive was a military offensive launched by the Syrian Arab Army against members of the Islamic State of Iraq and the Levant (ISIL) in the Deir ez-Zor Governorate, following the breaking of the three-year siege of the city of Deir ez-Zor. The Mayadin offensive, conducted by Syrian Army troops, was conducted with the aim of capturing ISIL's new de facto capital of Mayadin, and securing the villages and towns around it.

The offensive was concurrent with the Raqqa campaign conducted by the Syrian Democratic Forces (SDF) against ISIL's former de facto capital city and stronghold in Syria, as well as the Western Anbar campaign in Iraq.

The offensive 
The Syrian military advanced within 10 kilometers of ISIL's stronghold of Mayadin on 4 October. Concurrently, pro-opposition monitoring group Syrian Observatory for Human Rights claimed that Russian or Syrian airstrikes killed between 38 and 67 civilians who were crossing the Euphrates by boat near Mayadin. The next day, the Republican Guard, 4th Mechanized Division and 5th Legion made more steady advances, putting them within six kilometers of the city.

Syrian soldiers pushed into the city on 6 October from the west. The following day, government sources claimed roughly half of Mayadin was taken by the Syrian Army, while the airport was also taken. Throughout the day, a wave of Russian airstrikes against ISIL positions near Mayadin and close to the Iraqi border reportedly killed 180 ISIL militants, including a large number of foreign fighters. By 8 October, ISIL forces were reportedly encircled within the city. However, the next day, an ISIL counterattack managed to push back Syrian Army troops from Mayadin, with 38 soldiers being killed.

On 10 October 2017, fighting began in the suburbs in preparation to storm the city, according to a source citing SANA. On 11 October, the Syrian Army started encircling Mayadin, with the city surrounded by the following day. The Syrian Army then pushed into the western and northern parts of the city, capturing four neighborhoods.

On 14 October 2017, the Syrian Army captured Mayadin city. On the next day, elite Syrian Tiger Forces pushed through much rural territory of Mayadin and made advances towards town of Al-Asharah, reaching its outskirts. By 17 October, all besieged land between Deir ez-Zor and Mayadin along the Euphrates was captured by the Tiger Forces.

Aftermath 
By 20 October, the Syrian Army had crossed the Euphrates, capturing the village of Dhiban, and just hours later reaching the outskirts of the massive Al-Omar Oil Field complex, the largest such oil field in Syria, which in the pre-war era had contributed one quarter of Syria's oil production. In a surprise move, ISIL fighters defending Al-Omar Oil Field launched a powerful counterattack on the government bridgehead at Dhiban, forcing government forces to retreat back to the west bank of the Euphrates. During the same day, the Syrian Army advanced southwards from Mayadin, capturing the city of Al-Quriyah.

See also 

 Battle of Mosul (2016–2017)
 Battle of Raqqa (2017)

References 

Conflicts in 2017
Military operations of the Syrian civil war in 2017
Military operations of the Syrian civil war involving the Syrian government
Military operations of the Syrian civil war involving Russia
Military operations of the Syrian civil war involving the Islamic State of Iraq and the Levant
October 2017 events in Syria
Deir ez-Zor Governorate in the Syrian civil war